Sean Bennett (born March 31, 1996) is an American former cyclist, who competed as a professional between 2015 and 2022.

Career
In February 2018, Bennett was offered a contract with UCI Professional Continental team , following the departure of Adrien Costa from the team. He joined the team on February 5, leaving his previous team, .

He made his UCI World Tour debut in the 2018 Tour of California, finishing in second on stage 3. In May 2019, he was named in the startlist for the 2019 Giro d'Italia, notably finishing ninth in a sprint finish on the 18th stage. He also entered the race the following year, but did not finish. However, after the team folded at the end of 2021, he was forced to look for a new team for 2022, having to settle for UCI Continental team .

He retired at the end of the 2022 season, after being unable to find a team.

Major results
2013
 2nd Cross-country, National Junior Mountain Bike Championships
2014
 1st  Cross-country, National Junior Mountain Bike Championships
2017
 1st Stage 1 Tour Alsace (TTT)
 1st  Mountains classification Tour de Bretagne
2018
 1st Stage 6 Giro Ciclistico d'Italia
 7th Ronde van Vlaanderen Beloften
 7th Ghent–Wevelgem U23
 8th Overall Tour of the Gila
1st  Young rider classification
 8th Overall Istrian Spring Trophy
 9th Raiffeisen Grand Prix
 10th Grand Prix de Wallonie
2020
 8th La Drôme Classic
2021 
 10th Trofeo Andratx – Mirador d’Es Colomer
2022
 8th Overall Tour of Turkey

Grand Tour general classification results timeline

References

External links

1996 births
Living people
American male cyclists
People from El Cerrito, California
Cyclists from California